Kirk Powers is an American bassist. In 1976, he joined American Tears, one of the first keyboard-oriented Heavy Ivory bands. He also made pre-production demos and masters with Touch. He found work in the 1980s touring with various artists including Debbie Gibson's band 1986 through 1990 Out Of The Blue and Electric Youth tours. In July 2010 he started touring with the classic southern rock band Point Blank for an international tour.

Powers works with Alleva Coppolo Basses on his updated (KBP-4 and KBP-5) signature model custom basses and designing his own Musical Instrument Preamplifier.

1987–1990: Touring bass player for pop star singer, actress Debbie Gibson. Out Of The Blue and Electric Youth World tours.

1970s-current: Sessions, TV, jingles, theater.

2017: Powers began to work with Texas musician and songwriter Casey James – formerly of American Idol.

2018: A guest of Debbie Gibson on her Ladies of the 80s tour.

2019: Working with Grammy artists on a new Indie Film out of Austin, Texas.

2022: Touring bass player with pop star, singer, actress Debbie Gibson "The Body Remembers Tour" Summer '22

Discography 
 Deborah Gibson (Greatest Hits)
 Shake Your Love  (Live in London, Atlantic A9059CD)
 Debbie Gibson  Live In Japan
 Debbie Gibson "Electric Youth" (Atlantic  Album78203)
 Point Blank "Volume 9" 2014
 Wonder Years TV Show "sound track" Atlantic
 Ana  (Epic/ Park ZK45355)
 American Tears "Power House" Columbia
 Touch – "The Demos" Winter 1979
 Electric Youth World Tour '89-'90
 Out Of The Blue World Tour  '88
 Redd Volkaert (Grammy winner Guitar Virtuoso) Instructional Video Release 2015

Powers has worked with Debbie Gibson, Casey James, Dave Evans, Point Blank,Redd Volkaert, Roger Nichols, Otis Taylor, The Wonder Years, VooDoo Kings, Richard Gottehrer, Ana, American Tears, Pal Joey, Dave Lebolt, The Good Rats, Bruce Kulick, Lattanzi, JellyBean Benitez, Fred Norris from Howard Stern, Fred Zarr, George Lynch/Dokken, Derek St. Holmes/Ted Nugent, Guy Gelso, David Baker.

References 

Living people
1957 births
People from Queens, New York
20th-century American bass guitarists